The Treasury was a Welsh 19th century periodical first produced, for the Calvinistic Methodists, by D. Williams in Llanelli in 1864. Monthly editions were produced, edited by minister Joseph Evans (1832-1909).  Its articles highlighted religious subjects and denominational news. The journal has historical value as a record of the Evangelical Revival in Wales in the late 18th and early 19th century.

References 

Periodicals published in Wales
Magazines published in Wales
Religious magazines published in the United Kingdom